Banatsko Karađorđevo is a village in Serbia. It is situated in the Žitište municipality, Central Banat District, Vojvodina province. The population of the village numbering 2,508 people (2002 census), of whom 2,398 (95.61%) are ethnic Serbs.

Name
It is named after Karađorđe, the leader of the First Serbian Uprising (the  name means „the place of  Karađorđe in Banat“). In Hungarian, name Pálmajor is used for the village.

History

Banatsko Karađorđevo is one of the youngest settlements in Vojvodina. The construction of the settlement started in 1920 on the estate of Andrija Cekonjic, while first settlers arrived in 1921.

Historical population

1961: 5,426  
1971: 6,673
1981: 5,234
1991: 4,342
2002: 4,300

See also
List of places in Serbia
List of cities, towns and villages in Vojvodina

References
Slobodan Ćurčić, Broj stanovnika Vojvodine, Novi Sad, 1996.

External links

Banatsko Karađorđevo

Populated places in Serbian Banat